Stephen B. Hobbs (born November 14, 1965) is a former American football wide receiver. He played in the National Football League for the Washington Redskins. The 1991 season was his only complete season; injuries sidelined him during portions of his other playing years. He played college football at the University of North Alabama.

References

1965 births
Living people
People from Mendenhall, Mississippi
American football wide receivers
North Alabama Lions football players
Kansas City Chiefs players
Washington Redskins players